Morgan Smith (born 30 April 1998) is an English professional rugby league footballer who plays as a  or  for Wakefield Trinity in the Betfred Super League.

He previously played for the Warrington Wolves in the Super League, and on loan from Warrington at the Rochdale Hornets in the Betfred Championship. Smith has also played for the London Broncos in the Super League and the Championship as well as the York City Knights and Featherstone Rovers in the RFL Championship.

Background
Morgan Smith is the grandson of the rugby league footballer; Peter Smith.

Playing career

Warrington Wolves
He has played for the Warrington Wolves in the Super League, and on loan from Warrington for the Rochdale Hornets in the Betfred Championship. Smith has also played for the London Broncos in the Betfred Super League and the Championship.

Featherstone Rovers
On 21 Oct 2021 it was reported that he had signed for Featherstone Rovers in the RFL Championship.

Wakefield Trinity
On 7 Oct 2022 it was reported that he had signed for Wakefield Trinity in the Betfred Super League.

References

External links

London Broncos profile
Profile at warringtonwolves.com
SL profile

1998 births
Living people
Featherstone Rovers players
London Broncos players
Rochdale Hornets players
Rugby league five-eighths
Rugby league halfbacks
Rugby league players from Featherstone
Wakefield Trinity players
Warrington Wolves players
York City Knights players